William B. Hooper (1841 – January 16, 1870) was a Union Army soldier in the American Civil War who received the U.S. military's highest decoration, the Medal of Honor.

Hooper was born in Willimantic, Connecticut. He was awarded the Medal of Honor, for extraordinary heroism shown on March 31, 1865, while serving as a Corporal with Company L, 1st New Jersey Volunteer Cavalry, at  Chamberlains Creek, Virginia. His Medal of Honor was issued on July 3, 1865.

He died at the age of 29, on January 16, 1870, and was buried at the Old Willimantic Cemetery in Windham, Connecticut.

Medal of Honor citation

References

1841 births
1870 deaths
People from Willimantic, Connecticut
Union Army officers
United States Army Medal of Honor recipients
American Civil War recipients of the Medal of Honor
Military personnel from Connecticut
Burials in Connecticut